Jean Rasey (born 1954) is an American actress.

Early life
Jean Rasey attended the prestigious  American Conservatory Theater of San Francisco under scholarship for two years. She appeared in the theatrical production of Cyrano de Bergerac starring Marc Singer, Marsha Mason and Peter Donat. She also starred in smaller productions at A.C.T.

Career
Upon moving to Los Angeles, California in the late 1970s, Jean Rasey landed the ingenue role of Valerie Breslau in the 1975 motion picture The Hindenburg, directed by Robert Wise. That was the film that launched her acting career. Rasey also was featured in the Universal motion picture “Rollercoaster” directed by James Goldstone.

Continuing her theatrical background, Jean Rasey, also understudied Stockard Channing in the role of Rosiland in Tony Richardson's theatrical production of Shakespeare's As You Like It at the Long Beach Arena Theatre.

Jean Rasey starred as George Fayne opposite Pamela Sue Martin's Nancy Drew in the ABC television series The Hardy Boys/Nancy Drew Mysteries. From 1975 to 1976, she starred and guest starred in various other network television shows, motion pictures, commercials and theatrical productions. Jean Rasey starred hundreds of national commercials most notably Rasey starred as Jill in Union 76 television advertisements for ten years in the 1970s and 1980s.

Jean Rasey was the lead actress in the 2011 short film Man Who Sold The World, written and directed by Jillian Acreman. Along with Rasey, the film stars Steve Railsback (The Stunt Man, Helter Skelter) and Barry Livingston (Ernie from My Three Sons).

In 2018, Rasey starred in the critically acclaimed web-series "Break A Hip," which won a 2018 Primetime Emmy for Outstanding Actress in a Comedy or Drama Short Form Series for its star, Christina Pickles.  Rasey plays Brenda DeCarlo, the unscrupulous director of an assisted living facility.  The role was written especially for Rasey by writer/producer, Steve Cubine.

Filmography

Film

Television

References

Living people
American television actresses
1954 births
Place of birth missing (living people)
21st-century American women